I-See-You.Com is a 2006 comedy film directed and co-written by Eric Steven Stahl, starring Beau Bridges and Rosanna Arquette.

Plot
Harvey Bellinger (Beau Bridges), his wife Lydia (Rosanna Arquette), and their two teenage kids live a well-to-do life in suburbia. This changes, however, when their seventeen-year-old son puts video cameras around their house, and starts to broadcast the family's actions live on the internet. When Harvey finds out about this, he is angry and appalled. But when he realizes that money can be made with the internet broadcasts, the Bellingers start acting crazier, eventually leading to Harvey blowing up the house to get rid of the cameras.

Cast
 Beau Bridges as Harvey Bellinger 
 Rosanna Arquette as Lydia Ann Layton 
 Mathew Botuchis as Colby Allen
 Shiri Appleby as Randi Sommers 
 Dan Castellaneta as Jim Orr 
 Baelyn Neff as Audrey Bellinger 
 Victor Alfieri as Ciro Menotti 
 Tracee Ellis Ross as Nancy Tanaka
 Doris Roberts as Doris Bellinger 
 Héctor Elizondo as Greg Rishwain
 Mark Anthony Parrish as Stud at talent agency
 Tiffany Baldwin as Jessica
 William Dixon as Todd
 Robert A. Egan as Kløsen Executive #1
 Jeff Halbleib as Kløsen Executive #2
 Brittany Petros as Kløsen Executive #3
 Benton Jennings as HR Executive
 Mary Hart as herself
 Lisa Joyner as herself
 Shea Curry as Chloe
 Garry Marshall as himself
 Don LaFontaine as himself

References

External links 
 
 

2006 films
2006 comedy films
Films scored by Kevin Kiner
American comedy films
Films directed by Eric Steven Stahl
2000s English-language films
2000s American films
Films about the Internet